USS Sappho has been the name of more than one United States Navy ship, and may refer to:

 , a transport in commission from 1918 to 1919
 , an attack cargo ship in commission from 1945 to 1946

United States Navy ship names